is a Japanese swimmer. At the 2004 Summer Olympics, she won the gold medal in the 800 meter freestyle race. She was the first ever female gold medalist for Japan in a freestyle event.
She attended the National Institute of Fitness and Sports in Kanoya. In 2008 Shibata announced her retirement.

References

1982 births
Living people
Olympic swimmers of Japan
Swimmers at the 2004 Summer Olympics
Swimmers at the 2008 Summer Olympics
Olympic gold medalists for Japan
Japanese female freestyle swimmers
World Aquatics Championships medalists in swimming
People from Dazaifu, Fukuoka
Medalists at the 2004 Summer Olympics
Olympic gold medalists in swimming
Recipients of the Medal with Purple Ribbon
Sportspeople from Fukuoka Prefecture